Redmi 3 is an Android smartphone manufactured by Xiaomi. It has 5-inch HD IPS LCD display, and is powered by Qualcomm's Snapdragon 616 octa-core processor and 4100mAh battery.

References

3
Mobile phones introduced in 2016
Android (operating system) devices
Discontinued smartphones
Mobile phones with infrared transmitter